McCovey Cove is the unofficial name of a section of San Francisco Bay beyond the right field wall of Oracle Park, home of the San Francisco Giants, named after famed Giants first baseman Willie McCovey. The proper name for the cove is China Basin, which is the mouth of Mission Creek as it meets the bay. The cove is bounded along the north by Oracle Park, with a ferry landing and a breakwater at the northeast end. The southern shore is lined by China Basin Park and McCovey Point. To the east, it opens up to San Francisco Bay, while the west end of the cove is bounded by the Lefty O'Doul Bridge, named after San Francisco ballplayer and manager Lefty O'Doul.

Naming

The name was coined thanks to two sportswriters. Mark Purdy of the San Jose Mercury News wrote an article suggesting naming the body of water after McCovey, though his original suggestions were 'McCovey Channel,' 'McCovey Stream' or 'McCovey Run.'  Purdy then noted the more 'lyrical' name of 'McCovey Cove' was suggested by his colleague Leonard Koppett, a writer for the Oakland Tribune. The name did not take long to become very popular, although the moniker has never become official.

Features
On game days, fans take to the water of McCovey Cove in boats and even in kayaks, often with fishing nets in the hope of collecting a home run ball. This echoes what used to happen during McCovey's playing days. Before Candlestick Park's upper deck was extended, the area behind right field was occupied by three small bleacher sections and a lot of open space. Kids in those bleachers would gather behind the right field fence when "Stretch" would come to the plate. There may also be a link to the fact that Willie McCovey was one of only a few that hit home runs over the scoreboard and into a public swimming pool at Montreal's Jarry Park, the Expos' home from 1969 to 1976. The fact that balls can be hit into a water basin over the right field wall in San Francisco is somewhat of a tribute/salute to Willie McCovey's legend when he visited Montreal.

Just beyond the wall is a public waterfront promenade. Across the cove from the ballpark is McCovey Point and China Basin Park, featuring a statue of McCovey at the mouth of the Cove. At his feet are small plaques commemorating the winners of the Willie Mac Award, named in McCovey's honor. Along the southern shore of the cove, between McCovey Point and the O'Doul Bridge, is a walkway featuring plaques showing the Opening Day Roster of every Giants team from 1958 through 1999. Just south of the statue of Willie McCovey is Barry Bonds Junior Giants Field, a t-ball sized baseball diamond. (As of 2020, the features in this area have been temporarily warehoused while extensive construction takes place.)

Splash hits

A "splash hit" is recorded when a Giants player hits a home run that lands in McCovey Cove on the fly (home runs hit by opposing players are not recorded; nor are hits that strike or bounce off the stadium wall or pedestrian path). These hits are tallied on an electronic counter on the right field wall. As of July 17, 2022, 95 "splash hits" have been hit into the Bay by 23 Giants players since the park opened (all splash hits are in the regular season); 35 of those were by Barry Bonds. Six other Giants have reached the Cove more than twice: Brandon Belt (ten), Pablo Sandoval (eight), Denard Span (five), Mike Yastrzemski (five), Brandon Crawford (three), and LaMonte Wade Jr. (three). Five players—Felipe Crespo, Michael Tucker, Ryan Klesko, Aubrey Huff, and Andrés Torres—have done it twice. Fourteen other Giants players have accomplished the feat once. Carlos Beltrán's "splash hit" on September 14, 2011, marked his 300th career home run.  Klesko is currently the only player to have splash hits as both a Giant and as an opposing player through the 2019 season. Tyler Colvin's "splash hit" on May 12, 2014, was also his first hit for the Giants and occurred in his first at bat at Oracle Park since joining the team. Barry Bonds is the only player to have two splash hits in a single game, having done so on May 10, 2000, and May 18, 2002. On June 15, 2021, 2 different Giants players got splash hits in the same game for the first time: Steven Duggar and Mike Yastrzemski. On May 24, 2022, Joc Pederson became the second player to hit a splash hit as both a Giants player and a visiting player, joining Ryan Klesko. Pederson became the first player to have a splash hit for 3 different teams, having previously hit two splash hits while a member of the Los Angeles Dodgers and the Chicago Cubs.

Three "splash hits" have been walk-off home runs: Barry Bonds' on August 19, 2003, Brandon Crawford's on April 13, 2014, and Mike Yastrzemski's on July 29, 2020.

Denard Span is the only Giant to lead off with a splash hit, doing so on June 13, 2016.

As of the end of the 2019 season, Bonds is the only Giant to record a "splash hit" in the postseason. Bonds did so in the 5th inning of Game 3 of the 2002 National League Championship Series on October 12, 2002.

When the stadium hosted the 2007 Home Run Derby, McCovey Cove was heavily featured in promotional materials, and the namesake slugger presented each participant with special bats before the competition. However, the difficulty of hitting McCovey Cove with a home run was shown, as none of the eight sluggers competing were able to hit water, and all four left-handed batters (who are more likely to hit home runs to right field, and thus, to the Cove) were eliminated in the first round of the contest. The only player to hit water was Prince Fielder of the Milwaukee Brewers, who did so on a foul ball.  Fielder would eventually hit McCovey Cove with a fair ball on July 20, 2008, as the 17th visiting player to hit a home run into the Cove.

The majority of home runs surrendered into McCovey Cove have been off right-handed pitchers. 20 left-handed pitchers have surrendered a splash hit: Rich Rodriguez, Chuck McElroy, Vic Darensbourg, Brian Anderson, Jeriome Robertson, Chuck Finley, Ted Lilly, Ray King, Doug Davis, Joe Kennedy, Hong-Chih Kuo, Trever Miller, Wandy Rodríguez, Rex Brothers, David Price, Drew Smyly, Ranger Suárez, Matt Strahm, Alex Young, and Génesis Cabrera.

Four visiting pitchers have surrendered multiple "splash hits": Liván Hernández, Rodrigo López, John Thomson, and Chris Paddack. López is the only pitcher to give up a splash hit as a member of two visiting teams. No pitcher has surrendered 2 splash hits in the same game.

The most splash hits the Giants have had in a season is 11 in 2001, helped greatly by Barry Bonds successful chase to hit the most HRs in a season. On the flip side, the fewest the Giants have had in a season is 0 in 2015 (only 1 was hit in the cove that season, done so by Cody Asche of Philadelphia). This splash-hit drought lasted nearly 2 years: after Brandon Belt hit one on September 25, 2014, he would break the drought himself on June 8, 2016.

As of September 3, 2022, the only National League team the Giants have not had a splash hit against is the Pittsburgh Pirates.

Other McCovey Cove hits

44 non-Giants players have hit the cove 59 times. Of visiting players who have hit the cove, Max Muncy, Carlos Delgado, Carlos González and Adam LaRoche have performed the feat the most, doing it three times each. Current Major League Baseball players Joc Pederson, Bryce Harper and Mike Moustakas, and former Major League Baseball players Luis Gonzalez, Curtis Granderson and Cliff Floyd are the only other visiting players to do so twice. David Ortiz, Mitch Moreland, Adam Dunn, and Shin-Soo Choo are the only four American League players to hit the cove. Delgado, LaRoche, Harper, Moustakas,Pederson, and Blackmon are the only six players to have hit home runs into McCovey Cove as members of two visiting teams.

Every National League team has had at least one player hit a home run into McCovey Cove. The last club to have a player hit a ball into the water for the first time was the Cincinnati Reds, doing so in April 2021.  Of the 15 American League teams, only 4 (Boston, Chicago White Sox, Kansas City and Texas) have had a player hit a Home Run into McCovey Cove.  No player for the Houston Astros have hit a home run into McCovey Cove since the Astros moved to the American League.

Luis Gonzalez' splash hit on May 30, 2001, and Dioner Navarro's splash hit on July 20, 2011, remain the only two instances where a splash hit accounted for the only run of a game.

Two visiting players have hit McCovey Cove on the fly in the postseason. Rick Ankiel hit the water on the fly in the 11th inning of Game 2 of the 2010 National League Division Series on October 8, 2010; his run would go on to be the winning run for the Atlanta Braves. Ankiel's home run was the second in postseason history to be hit straight into the cove. Bryce Harper became the second visitor to hit the water in the postseason in the 7th inning of Game 4 of the 2014 National League Division Series on October 7, 2014, as a member of the Washington Nationals.

Tim Lincecum has surrendered the most McCovey home runs to visitors, having done so five times. The other Giants to give up multiple are Madison Bumgarner and Johnny Cueto with four and Matt Cain, Kevin Correia, Tim Hudson, Matt Morris, Hunter Strickland, Brett Tomko, and Ryan Vogelsong twice each. Correia is the only pitcher to have given up a splash hit both as a Giant and as a visiting pitcher (while pitching for the Los Angeles Dodgers in 2014).

Players from opposing teams have hit home runs into McCovey Cove in the same game three times: on May 28, 2001 (Felipe Crespo and Mark Grace); on May 12, 2014 (Tyler Colvin and Freddie Freeman); and on August 9, 2019 (Stephen Vogt and Bryce Harper).

References

External links

Unraveling the scientific secrets of the elusive 'Splash Hit' (San Francisco Chronicle)
Splash Hits: SFGiants.com

Landforms of the San Francisco Bay Area
San Francisco Giants